Nahal settlements (Heahzut Nahal) were settlements established by Nahal soldiers in Israel and Israeli-occupied territories. Supporting Jewish settlement growth and expansion throughout Israel was once the main focus of the Nahal military brigade, and was primarily carried out through the Garin ("Seed") program. The goal for every Nahal settlement was to become a civilian settlement and serve as a first line of defense against potential future Arab invasions while providing a base of operations and resources for military forces operating in peripheral regions.

This method of encouraging settlement was particularly effective in less desirable areas (mainly, in the Negev, the Galilee, the Arabah, and after the Six-Day War the West Bank, the Gaza Strip, the Golan Heights and the Sinai Peninsula).

The first Nahal settlement was Nahal Oz located in the northwestern Negev desert close to the border with the Gaza Strip.

A number of former Nahal settlements are now entirely civilian. Many of today's kibbutzim were originally Nahal settlements. The last Nahal settlement was closed in 2001.

References

Veterans' settlement schemes